Rajendra Pradhan (born 17 October 1954) is a Nepalese weightlifter. He competed in the men's featherweight event at the 1980 Summer Olympics.

References

1954 births
Living people
Nepalese male weightlifters
Olympic weightlifters of Nepal
Weightlifters at the 1980 Summer Olympics
Place of birth missing (living people)